Euromoney Institutional Investor PLC is one of Europe's largest business and financial information companies which has interests in business and financial publishing and event organization. It was listed on the London Stock Exchange and was a constituent of the FTSE 250 Index until it was acquired by private equity groups, Astorg and Epiris, in November 2022.

History
Euromoney magazine was founded by Sir Patrick Sergeant in 1969 as an international business-to-business media group focused primarily on the international finance sector. The costs to launch the magazine were covered with £6,000 from Associated Newspapers and £200 from Sergeant himself and a number of other Mail employees, with Hambros Bank putting up stand-by credit. Padraic Fallon joined the magazine as editor. He would takeover as chairman and executive after Sergeant, overseeing the company until his death in 2012.

Patrick Sergeant continued to manage the business until 1985 when he became chairman. The company was first listed on the London Stock Exchange in 1986. Sergeant retired as chairman in September 1992 when he was appointed president and non-executive director, but served as a board member until May 2018.

It was formerly 49% owned by the Daily Mail and General Trust Group until the stake was spun-off in 2019.

In July 2022, the company agreed to accept a takeover offer worth £1.7 billion from private equity groups, Astorg and Epiris. The transaction was approved by the court on 22 November 2022.

Acquisitions
Acquisitions include:

 1989 International Tax Review (ITR)
 1991 Managing IP
 1996 Reactions magazine
 January 1999 ISI Emerging Markets
 2003 Hedge Fund Intelligence
 February 2004 Information Management Network (IMN)
 2006 Metal Bulletin
 2006 BCA Research
 October 2006 Total Derivatives
 May 2008 BPR Benchmark
 May 2008 Benchmark Financials
 August 2010 Arete Consulting
 August 2011 Ned Davis Research Inc.
 February 2012 Global Grain Geneva
 January 2013 TTI/Vanguard
 March 2013 Insider Publishing
 April 2013 Centre for Investor Education
 April 2013 Quantitative Techniques
 October 2013 IJ Online
 July 2014 Mining Indaba
 August 2016 FastMarkets
 March 2017 BroadMedia Communications
 June 2018 The Deal
 June 2018 BoardEx
 May 2021 Relationship Science

Portfolio 
Euromoney's portfolio includes brands such as Euromoney, Institutional Investor, BCA Research, Ned Davis Research, Fastmarkets MB, Fastmarkets AMM, International Tax Review, International Financial Law Review (IFLR), Managing Intellectual Property (MIP), SRP, Random Lengths, EMIS, Insurance Insider, Fastmarkets RISI, Global Capital and IJGlobal.

International Tax Review (ITR) provides comprehensive coverage of international tax news and policy analysis, as well as surveys, in-depth features and unique guides to the most recent deals. The magazine has interviewed numerous politicians and economists, including Arthur Laffer, Pierre Moscovici and Margrethe Vestager. The International Financial Law Review is the "market-leading financial law publication for lawyers in financial institutions, corporates and private practice".

The company also provides training services: the London Metal Exchange announced in January 2015 that it would partner with the company to offer specialist courses.

References

External links

Magazine publishing companies of the United Kingdom
Publishing companies established in 1969
Institutional investors
1980s initial public offerings
1969 establishments in England
Companies listed on the London Stock Exchange